Nebojša Gudelj (Serbian Cyrillic: Небојша Гудељ; born 23 September 1968) is a Serbian football manager and former player.

Playing career
Born in Trebinje, Bosnia and Herzegovina, Gudelj started out at his hometown club Leotar, collecting 87 appearances in the Yugoslav Second League between 1988 and 1991. He subsequently switched to Partizan, winning four trophies with the Crno-beli, including the double in the 1993–94 season. Gudelj played 123 official matches for Partizan.

In the summer of 1994, Gudelj moved abroad and signed with Spanish club Logroñés. He spent two seasons there, before joining fellow Segunda División club Leganés. In the summer of 1997, Gudelj moved to the Netherlands and signed with NAC Breda. He spent the next eight seasons there, appearing in almost 300 official matches for the club. In the 2005–06 season, Gudelj played for Sparta Rotterdam, before retiring from the game.

Managerial career
Gudelj was manager of NAC Breda from November 2012 to October 2014.

He became the manager of Dalian Istar, a youth club, in 2018. In 2021, the club moved to Hubei and merged with Hubei Istar, and he was appointed as the supervisor for first team and youth team.

Personal life
His two sons, Nemanja and Dragiša, are both Serbia international footballers.

Honours
Partizan
 First League of FR Yugoslavia: 1992–93, 1993–94
 FR Yugoslavia Cup: 1991–92, 1993–94

NAC Breda
 Eerste Divisie: 1999–2000

References

External links
 
 

Association football midfielders
Serbian expatriate footballers
Serbian expatriate sportspeople in Spain
Serbian expatriate sportspeople in the Netherlands
Serbian football managers
Serbian footballers
CD Leganés players
CD Logroñés footballers
Eerste Divisie players
Eredivisie managers
Eredivisie players
Expatriate footballers in Spain
Expatriate footballers in the Netherlands
First League of Serbia and Montenegro players
FK Leotar players
FK Partizan players
La Liga players
NAC Breda managers
NAC Breda players
People from Trebinje
Segunda División players
Sparta Rotterdam players
Yugoslav First League players
Yugoslav footballers
1968 births
Living people